Quimby Island is a small island in the Sacramento–San Joaquin River Delta, whose coordinates are . It is in Contra Costa County, and managed by Reclamation District 2090.

References

Islands of Contra Costa County, California
Islands of the Sacramento–San Joaquin River Delta
Islands of Northern California